NJA may refer to:
 New Jewish Agenda, former US organization
 Naval Air Facility Atsugi, Japan, IATA code
 New Japan Aviation, Kagoshima, services company, ICAO code
 Newman-Janis Algorithm, a method of finding solutions in general relativity